Pediapelta ternaria is a species of tephritid or fruit flies in the genus Pediapelta of the family Tephritidae.

Distribution
Kenya, Zimbabwe, South Africa.

References

Tephritinae
Insects described in 1861
Diptera of Africa